El Faro may refer to:
 El Faro (digital newspaper), an online newspaper founded in 1998
 The Lighthouse (1998 film) (also: El faro), an Argentine-Spanish drama
 El Faro Restaurant, a Spanish restaurant in New York City which closed in 2012
 El Faro Towers, a high-rise residential complex of two, twin interconnected skyscrapers
 , a cargo ship that sank with all hands in 2015

See also
 Faro (disambiguation)